Andrew Fairlie may refer to:

 Andrew Fairlie (actor) (born 1963), Scottish actor
 Andrew Fairlie (chef) (1963–2019), Scottish chef